"Don't Give Me Your Life" is a song recorded by Italian electronic dance music group Alex Party. It is produced by Italian producer brothers Paolo and Gianni Visnadi with DJ Alex Natale, and was released in February 1995 as the first single from their first and only album, Alex Party (1996). The vocals are performed by British singer Robin 'Shanie' Campbell, who also wrote the lyrics and melody. The song peaked at number two in the UK and number five on the Billboard Hot Dance Club Play chart in the US. It also topped the Club Record category at Music Weeks 1995 Awards. Today, it is widely regarded as one of the biggest dance anthems of the 1990s. Idolator ranked it number 21 in their list of "The 50 Best Pop Singles of 1995" in 2015.

In 1999, "Don't Give Me Your Life" was re-released, with new mixes included and a full length bonus track Megamix from 1994. A music video was produced twice for the song; in 1995 and 1999.

Background
After the success with their first single, "Read My Lips/Saturday Night Party" which peaked at number 29 in the UK and became an Ibiza anthem during the summer of 1993, producers and brothers Paolo and Gianni Visnadi, with DJ Alex Natale, wanted to create something more oriented to the underground scene. But they then decided to add a voice to it. Through their label they were introduced to British singer Robin 'Shanie' Campbell, who wrote the lyrics for "Don't Give Me Your Life". The lyrics tells the story of a woman that tells her man that she doesn't need him anymore. He has been treating her badly, cheating on her and she has had enough, telling him that she don't need his love/life.

The quartet's varied experiences gave the song a unique sound and a sophisticated flare compared to the other stomping grooves at the time. The means of productions back then were not like today, and the production phase was actually more challenging. The hardest part was the huge amount of work during the assembly, once the vocals were recorded on tape. After that, every single phrase from the vocals was sampled individually and controlled via midi with an Atari computer.

Critical reception
Larry Flick from American magazine Billboard wrote, "This popular U.K. import, is showing early signs of widespread approval from a variety of dance programmers. Producer Visnadi and Alex Natale offer a jumpy bassline and carnival-like keyboards, while resident singer Shanie bumps and grinds with giddy abandon. The chorus will have you reaching for your tambourine and platform boots." Another editor, Mark Dezzani, said, "The single, like the tracks from the pioneering Italian dance act Black Box, epitomizes Italy's knack for producing perfect pop tunes using the latest in musical technology." Robbie Daw from Idolator declared it as a "kiss-off anthem" and "one big F U to a no-good ex". He complimented Campbell as "the epitome of powerhouse dance diva." In his weekly UK chart commentary, James Masterton viewed it as "a brilliantly commercial piece of dance". Pan-European magazine Music & Media commented, "Vocals by Shanie, rap by Danny Johnston; assemble these two elements and you get one of the catchiest Euro tracks currently available." Alan Jones from Music Week said, "A startlingly simple but hugely effective Italo-NRG bouncer with an impossibly catchy chorus, it could go all the way." James Hamilton from the RM Dance Update described it as a "girl sung sometimes somewhat Whigfield-ishly tinged (but no ducks!) jaunty Euro romp".

"Don't Give Me Your Life" was ranked number 21 in Idolators list of "The 50 Best Pop Singles Of 1995" in 2015. It was also ranked number nine in Attitude'''s list of "The Top 10 Dance Tunes Of The '90s" in 2016.

Chart performance
"Don't Give Me Your Life" reached number two in Ireland, Scotland and the UK, becoming their highest-charting hit in those countries. In the latter, it peaked at number two on March 5, 1995, in its fourth week on the UK Singles Chart. The single spent two weeks at that position and was held off reaching number-one by Celine Dion's "Think Twice". It also peaked at number six in Iceland, number 16 in Denmark and the Netherlands, and number 18 in the group's native Italy. In addition, it topped both Music Weeks On a Pop Tip Club Chart and the Club Record category at Music Weeks 1995 Awards. On the Eurochart Hot 100, it reached number nine on March 11. Outside Europe, "Don't Give Me Your Life" was successful in Israel, peaking at number two and on the US Billboard Hot Dance Club Play chart, where it hit number five. In Australia, it reached a respectable number 13. The song was included on numerous compilation albums all over the world, and remains to date the most successful release by Alex Party.

"Don't Give Me Your Life" was awarded with a gold record in the UK, with a sale of 400,000 singles.

Music video
A music video was produced to promote the single, directed by La La Land, who had previously directed the video for 2 Unlimited's "No One" and Whigfield's "Saturday Night". "Don't Give Me Your Life" features singer Robin 'Shanie' Campbell and dancers. She wears a white high neck sweater and performs toward a dark background. The male dancer in the video is actor and dancer Jake Canuso, known for his role in the British TV series Benidorm, in which he plays barman Mateo Castellanos. "Don't Give Me Your Life" was later published on YouTube in May 2011. It had generated more than 3 million views as of January 2023.

Live performances
Alex Party performed "Don't Give Me Your Life" in the British music chart television programme Top of the Pops three times in 1995. The first performance was at February 16, after reaching number ten in the UK Singles Chart. Then at March 2, after reaching number three with 150 000 copies sold, and again at March 16, after reaching number two with 350 000 copies sold.

Track listing

 Italy Vinyl, 12" (1994)"Don't Give Me Your Life" (Original Mix) – 5:13
"Don't Give Me Your Life" (Classic Alex Party Mix) – 5:33
"Don't Give Me Your Life" (LWS Remix) – 4:39
"Don't Give Me Your Life" (LWS DJ's Choice Instrumental) – 5:03

 UK Vinyl single, 7" (1994)"Don't Give Me Your Life" (Classic Edit) – 3:16
"Don't Give Me Your Life" (Dancing Divaz Edit)
"Don't Give Me Your Life" (Saturday Night FMS Edit)

 UK CD single (1995)"Don't Give Me Your Life" (Classic Edit) – 3:16
"Don't Give Me Your Life" (Classic Alex Party Mix (V1)) – 6:31
"Don't Give Me Your Life" (Dancing Divaz Edit) – 3:10
"Don't Give Me Your Life" (Saturday Night FMS Edit) – 4:34
"Don't Give Me Your Life" (Dancing Divaz Club Mix) – 8:16
"Don't Give Me Your Life" (Classic Alex Party Mix) – 5:33
"Don't Give Me Your Life" (Original Mix) – 5:13
"Don't Give Me Your Life" (LWS Bitch Mix) – 4:41 

 Netherlands Maxi-Single (1995)"Don't Give Me Your Life" (Original Radio Version) – 3:35
"Don't Give Me Your Life" (Classic Alex Party Radio Version) – 3:58
"Don't Give Me Your Life" (Dancing Divaz Edit) – 3:10
"Don't Give Me Your Life" (Saturday Night FMS) – 4:33
"Don't Give Me Your Life" (LWS Bitch Mix) – 4:41
"Don't Give Me Your Life" (Original Mix) – 5:13
"Don't Give Me Your Life" (Dancing Divaz Club Mix) – 8:15
"Don't Give Me Your Life" (Dancing Divaz Rhythm Mix) – 6:02
"Don't Give Me Your Life" (Classic Alex Party) – 5:33 

 US Maxi-Single (1995)"Don't Give Me Your Life" (Classic Edit) – 3:16
"Don't Give Me Your Life" (Dancing Divaz Edit) – 3:07
"Don't Give Me Your Life" (Classic Alex Party Mix (V1)) – 6:31
"Don't Give Me Your Life" (Dancing Divaz Club Mix) – 8:13
"Don't Give Me Your Life" (LWS Bitch Mix) – 4:40

 Sweden Maxi-Single (Remix) (1995)'''
"Don't Give Me Your Life" (Pierre J's Alternative Radio Remix) – 3:38
"Don't Give Me Your Life" (Pierre J's Full Organ Remix) – 8:48
"Don't Give Me Your Life" (Orgasmic Mix) – 7:21
"Don't Give Me Your Life" (June Party) – 4:12

Charts

Weekly charts

Year-end charts

Certifications

References

1995 singles
1994 songs
Alex Party songs
English-language Italian songs
Songs about heartache
Music videos directed by La La Land